Mahasamudram is a 2006 Indian Malayalam-language drama film written and directed by S. Janardanan and produced by G. Suresh Kumar through Revathy Kalamandhir. It stars Mohanlal, Laila Mehdin, Innocent, Jagathy Sreekumar, and Rahman. The film features songs composed by M. Jayachandran and background score by Kannan Sooraj Balan. Mahasamudram was released on the occasion of Onam in 2006. It was a commercial success at the box office.

Plot 

Isahak is a fisherman with his heart in the right place. He is the pivot around which an old-age home run by a priest revolves. Isahak bears the entire expenses of the home, one of whose inmates is his mentally ill father Velankani. Incidentally, Isahak is also the star player of his football club called Beach Eleven of Puthenkara. Their arch-rivals belonging to village Mattukara are named the Seven Stars. Mattukara is under the control of the villains.

As it often happens, Isahak falls in love with Mattakara Chandran's sister Devi. The brother is not amused, and he vows to frustrate the lovers' plans. Unfazed, the lovers get married on the high seas and plan to spend their first night on the boat. The bride's brother is bent on killing the newly-wed couple.

But fate has other ideas. In the melee that follows, Devi accidentally kills her brother. She is arrested, and a heartbroken Isahak is left to fend for himself. In another twist in the tale, the villains of Mattukara kidnap Isahak's father Velankani. Their condition for releasing him: Isahak should not play in the football match for Beach Eleven in the tournament.

Meanwhile, Devi comes out of jail on parole. The denouement puts Isahak in a dilemma. He is caught between his wife and father.

Cast
 Mohanlal as Isahak Velankanni
 Innocent as Velankanni, Isahak's father 
 Laila as Devi, Isahak's wife 
 Jagathy Sreekumar as Father Michael
 Rahman as Rarichan 
 Jagadeesh as Jackson
 Krishnaprasad as Thampi
 Sai Kumar as M.L.A Sebastian George / Seban
 Sethu N. V. as Prathapan
 Indrans as Kapyar
 M. R. Gopakumar as Unni Pillai
 Suja Karthika as Chandrika
 Kalasala Babu as Mattakara Philipose
 Rizabava as Mattakara Chandran
 Baburaj as Mattakara Reji
 Biju Pappan as Mathews
 Niyas Musliyar as Justin
 Subair as CI Alex
 Seema G. Nair as Hima, Devi's sister
 Manka Mahesh as Martha, Isahak's mother
 I. M. Vijayan as himself
 Poojappura Ravi
 Santhakumari

Production
The second schedule of filming was held at Thiruvananthapuram and Andaman Islands. Climax scenes were shot at Vizhinjam Beach, Thiruvananthapuram.

Soundtrack 
The film's soundtrack contains five songs, all composed by M. Jayachandran and lyrics by Kaithapram Damodaran Namboothiri.

Release
The film was originally scheduled to be released on 25 August 2006, but was postponed because the makers decided to shoot one more song featuring Mohanlal and to not compete with Mohanlal's Keerthichakra which was already running successfully in theatres. Mahasamudram was released on 1 September 2006 on the occasion of Onam.

Box office
Mahasamudram was the top-grossing film among the Onam releases in Kerala in the initial weeks, beating Classmates. However, Classmates surpassed the film in the following weeks. The film was a commercial success at the box office.

References

External links

2006 films
2006 action films
2000s Malayalam-language films
Indian association football films
Films shot in Thiruvananthapuram
Films shot in Kollam
Films scored by M. Jayachandran

ml:മഹാസമുദ്രം